Garberville Airport  is a public airport located  southwest of the central business district (CBD) of Garberville, a town in Humboldt County, California, USA.

References

External links 

Live Webcams and AWOS screen at Garberville Airport
Airports in Humboldt County, California